Hon'inbō Shūetsu (本因坊秀悦, 1850 – 23 August 1890) was a Japanese professional Go player, and fifteenth head of the Hon'inbō house.

Biography
He came young to the headship on the death of his father Hon'inbō Shūwa. He was the eldest son, but Murase Shūho had claims to be the natural successor. Shūetsu's time was marked by intrigue, illness, and the collapse of the old order based on state support of the game of go, that had been in place for around 250 years. Shūetsu relinquished control of the house, to the next brother, Shūho being kept in the cold.

External links
 Page at Sensei's Library

1850 births
1890 deaths
Japanese Go players